JFK Medical Center may refer to:
 JFK Medical Center (Atlantis, Florida)
 JFK Medical Center (Edison, New Jersey)
 John F. Kennedy Medical Center (Liberia)